Vương Đình Huệ (born 15 March 1957) is a Vietnamese politician and Professor in Economics. He is currently the Chairman of the National Assembly of Vietnam, and Secretary of the Hanoi Party Committee. He was previously Minister of Finance and head of the PCC Economic Commission (Ban Kinh tế Trung ương), a central committee consulting agency for economic policies and strategies. He is also a member of the 10th, 11th and 12th Central Committee of the Communist Party of Vietnam. In addition, he served as Deputy Prime Minister of the Socialist Republic of Vietnam (2016 – 2020)

Education and career 
From September 1979 to 1985, Huệ was a lecturer at the University of Finance and Accountancy. He began his studies for a master's degree at the Faculty of European Studies of the Ha Noi University of Foreign Languages the same year, ending his studies in 1986. Between 1986 and 1990, he was a Ph.D. candidate at University of Economics in Bratislava in Czechoslovakia.

He then moved on to work as a lecturer at the Faculty of Accounting, Hanoi University of Finance and Accountacy from 1991 to 1992, after which he served as Deputy Dean of Faculty of Accounting, Hanoi University of Finance and Accountancy from October 1992 to April 1994. He became Dean of Faculty of Accounting, staying in the position from May 1994 to February 1999. He then became Assistant Principal on training, a position he kept from March 1999 until June 2001.

From July 2001 to June 2006, Huệ served as Vice Chief State Auditor, and from July 2006 to August 2011, he served as Chief State Auditor. He became Minister of Finance in August 2011, and served in the position until February 2013.

From December 2012 to January 2016, Huệ served as Head of the Party Central Committee's Economic Commission. After this, he became a member of the Politburo, and was Head of the Member of the Politburo, Head of the Party Central Committee's Economic Commission between January and April 2016. He continued to serve as a member of the Politburo, and went on to serve as Deputy Prime Minister, Head of the Steering Committee for the Southwest Region between April 2016 and February 7, 2020.

Huệ took office as Secretary of the Hanoi Party Committee on February 7, 2020.

References

Finance ministers of Vietnam
Members of the 12th Politburo of the Communist Party of Vietnam
Members of the 13th Politburo of the Communist Party of Vietnam
Members of the 10th Central Committee of the Communist Party of Vietnam
Members of the 11th Central Committee of the Communist Party of Vietnam
Members of the 12th Central Committee of the Communist Party of Vietnam
Members of the 13th Central Committee of the Communist Party of Vietnam
Government ministers of Vietnam
Living people
1957 births